is a Japanese jazz trombonist.

Mukai attended Doshisha University but left before obtaining his degree to become a professional musician. Early in his career he worked with Yoshio Otomo, Ryo Kawasaki, and Hiroshi Fukumura, then led his own ensemble, including a performance at the Shinjuku Jazz Festival. He went on to work with Terumasa Hino, Akira Sakata, Kazumi Watanabe, and Yosuke Yamashita, as well as the ensemble Spik and Span and international musicians such as João Bosco, Billy Hart, and Elvin Jones. In the 1990s and 2000s he taught jazz at Senzoku Gakuen school of music.

References
"Shigeharu Mukai". The New Grove Dictionary of Jazz. 2nd edition, ed. Barry Kernfeld.

1949 births
Living people
Japanese jazz trombonists
Musicians from Aichi Prefecture
People from Nagoya